Andrew Adgate (22 March 1762 in Norwich, Connecticut – 30 September 1793 in Philadelphia, Pennsylvania) was a musician, music director, and author from Philadelphia, Pennsylvania.

He is noted for founding the Institution for Encouragement of Church Music in Philadelphia, Pennsylvania in 1784, which became the Free School for Spreading the Knowledge of Vocal Music the following year.  He directed choral concerts in Philadelphia from 1785 through 1793, performing both European and American works.  He also founded the Uranian Academy in 1787.

Works
Rudiments of Music
Philadelphia Harmony
Selection of Sacred Harmony

References
Who Was Who in America: Historical Volume, 1607-1896. Chicago: Marquis Who's Who, 1963.

External links

1762 births
1793 deaths
Musicians from Philadelphia
American choral conductors
American male conductors (music)
18th-century American people
People from Norwich, Connecticut
18th-century conductors (music)
People of colonial Connecticut
Classical musicians from Pennsylvania